Christian Johannes de Wilzem  (14 October 1932 – 6 March 2006) was a South African rugby union player.

Playing career
De Wilzem was born and raised in Queenstown. He played 55 matches for the Free State and captained the team on five occasions.

De Wilzem toured with the Springboks to Australia and New Zealand in 1956. He did not play in any test matches, but did play in 16 tour matches and scored one try.

See also
List of South Africa national rugby union players – Springbok no. 335

References

1932 births
2006 deaths
South African rugby union players
South Africa international rugby union players
Free State Cheetahs players
Blue Bulls players
Rugby union flankers
Rugby union players from the Eastern Cape